Fire Angels is a 1998 fantasy fiction novel by Jane Routley. It follows the first book in the series, Mage Heart, with Dion reuniting with family and finding her homeland overrun with Witch Hunters and Fire Angels.

Background
Fire Angels was first published in the United States on 1 June 1998 by Avon Eos in trade paperback format. It was released the United States and Australia in mass market paperback format in January 1999 and September 2000 respectively. Fire Angels won the 1998 Aurealis Award for best fantasy novel.

References

External links

1998 novels
Australian fantasy novels
Aurealis Award-winning works
HarperCollins books